The Stipe Cotton Gin is a historic cotton gin at Florida and Cypress Streets in Beebe, Arkansas.  It is a two-story steel-framed structure, clad in corrugated metal, that houses the steam compressor and other equipment for processing and baling cotton.  The complex also includes a seed storage building, and a circular structure of uncertain function.  Built about 1930, it is one of only five to survive in White County from that period, when cotton production was locally at its peak.

The complex was listed on the National Register of Historic Places in 1992.

See also
National Register of Historic Places listings in White County, Arkansas

References

Agricultural buildings and structures on the National Register of Historic Places in Arkansas
Cotton gin
Buildings and structures in Beebe, Arkansas
National Register of Historic Places in White County, Arkansas
Industrial buildings and structures on the National Register of Historic Places in Arkansas
Cotton industry in the United States
1930 establishments in Arkansas
Industrial buildings completed in 1930